Jonah William "Quiet Joe" Knight (September 28, 1859 – October 16, 1938) was a professional baseball player. He played two seasons in Major League Baseball for the Philadelphia Quakers (1884) and Cincinnati Reds (1890), primarily as a left fielder.

A native of Port Stanley, Ontario, Knight came up to the big leagues as a pitcher in 1884. In six starts for the Quakers he won 2, lost 4, and had an earned run average of 5.47 in 51 innings. He struck out 8 and walked 21.

Six years later he returned to the major leagues, this time as an outfielder. As the everyday left fielder for the 77–55 Reds, he finished sixth in the National League with a .312 batting average, hit 4 home runs, and drove in 67 runs. He also ranked sixth in the league with 26 doubles. His final major league appearance was October 3, 1890 at the age of 31.

His two-season career statistics include 133 games played, a .309 batting average (156-for-505), 4 home runs, 69 RBI, 69 runs scored, an on-base percentage of .362 and a slugging percentage of .422.

Knight died at the age of 79 in Lynhurst, Ontario, Canada.

References

External links

1859 births
1938 deaths
19th-century baseball players
Baseball people from Ontario
Buffalo Bisons (minor league) players
Canadian expatriate baseball players in the United States
Major League Baseball left fielders
Major League Baseball pitchers
Philadelphia Quakers players
Cincinnati Reds players
Quincy Quincys players
East Saginaw Grays players
Bay City (minor league baseball) players
Muskegon (minor league baseball) players
London Cockneys players
Hamilton Clippers players
Hamilton Hams players
London Tecumsehs (baseball) players
Rochester Hop Bitters players
Binghamton Bingos players
Syracuse Stars (minor league baseball) players
Utica Stars players
Binghamton Bingoes players
Providence Clamdiggers (baseball) players
Wilkes-Barre Coal Barons players
Providence Grays (minor league) players
St. Thomas Saints players
Rochester Patriots players
Ottawa Wanderers players
People from Elgin County
Major League Baseball players from Canada